Queer Lake is a natural lake in Hamilton County, New York, in the United States. The lake was so named on account of its unusual shape.

Fishing

Fish species present in the lake are black bullhead, brook trout, white sucker and pumpkinseed sunfish. There is trail access on the north and west shore. No motors are allowed on this lake.

See also
List of lakes in New York

References

Lakes of New York (state)
Lakes of Hamilton County, New York